Italian Language Examinations features the examinations for the Italian language for foreigners.  They provide applicants with the ability to officially recognize competency in speaking Italian at various levels.
Examinations include:

CELI
CILS (Qualification)
CIC
 PLIDA
 AIL

Italian language tests